Christian Ludwig "Chrislo" Haas (16 November 1956 – 23 October 2004) was a West German Neue Deutsche Welle musician best known as a member of Liaisons Dangereuses and a founding member of Minus Delta t, D.A.F and Der Plan, and also as a member of Crime & the City Solution.

Haas was born in Aichach and moved to West Berlin. He heavily influenced the German music scene of the 1980s through his work on the synthesizer (Korg MS-20) with bands such as Minus Delta t, D.A.F., CHBB/Liaisons Dangereuses and Crime & the City Solution. He is regarded as one of the founding fathers of techno and modern electronic dance music. His former D.A.F bandmate Gabi Delgado said in 2015 that "Chrislo Haas influenced me more than Robert, in his extreme, über-punk way. Chrislo was a natural-born provocateur, which I liked."

Haas' work was extensively documented in Verschwende Deine Jugend (Waste Your Youth), Jürgen Teipel's book on the Neue Deutsche Welle.

Haas died in late October 2004 at the age of 47 in Berlin from circulatory collapse due to excessive alcohol consumption.

Solo discography

As Chrislo:

 Low (2×LP/CD, Tresor TRESOR-92, 1998)
 "La Chouette" (7:31) / "Hangars D'Orion" (11:00) / "Système Nerveux" (5:00) / "Fils D'O." (5:45) / "Le Bleu" (2:20) / "Double Brin" (5:40) / "2CV d'O." (4:50) / "Gromelo" (5:25) / "L'Eau" (6:30)
 "Hangars D'Orion" (11:00) // "La Chouette" (Surgeon Remix) (4:31) / "2 CV D'Orion" (Regis Berlin Mix) (4:52) (12", Tresor TRESOR-91, 1998)

Further reading
Jürgen Teipel. Verschwende Deine Jugend. Ein Doku-Roman über den deutschen Punk und New Wave. Suhrkamp, Frankfurt/Main 2001, .
Rüdiger Esch. Electri_City. Elektronische Musik aus Düsseldorf 1970-1986. Suhrkamp, Berlin 2014,

References

1956 births
2004 deaths
People from Aichach
German new wave musicians
Alcohol-related deaths in Germany
20th-century German musicians
Crime & the City Solution members
Deutsch Amerikanische Freundschaft members